The Honour of the House is a 1999 Icelandic film directed by Guðný Halldórsdóttir. It was Iceland's official Best Foreign Language Film submission at the 72nd Academy Awards, but did not manage to receive a nomination.

Cast
 Tinna Gunnlaugsdóttir as Þuríður
 Ragnhildur Gísladóttir as Rannveig
 Agneta Ekmanner as Prófastsfrú
 Rúrik Haraldsson as Prófastur
 Egill Ólafsson as Björn

See also
 List of submissions to the 72nd Academy Awards for Best Foreign Language Film
 List of Icelandic submissions for the Academy Award for Best Foreign Language Film

References

External links

Icelandic drama films
1990s Icelandic-language films
1999 films
Films directed by Guðný Halldórsdóttir
Films scored by Hilmar Örn Hilmarsson
1999 drama films